The Sepik is the longest river on the island of New Guinea, and the second largest in Oceania by discharge volume after the Fly River. The majority of the river flows through the Papua New Guinea (PNG) provinces of Sandaun (formerly West Sepik) and East Sepik, with a small section flowing through the Indonesian province of Papua.

The Sepik has a large catchment area, and landforms that include swamplands, tropical rainforests and mountains. Biologically, the river system is often said to be possibly the largest uncontaminated freshwater wetland system in the Asia-Pacific region. But, in fact, numerous fish and plant species have been introduced into the Sepik since the mid-20th century.

Name 
In 1884, Germany asserted control over the northeast quadrant of the island of New Guinea, which became part of the German colonial empire. The colony was initially managed by the Deutsche Neuguinea-Kompagnie or German New Guinea Company, a commercial enterprise that christened the territory Kaiser-Wilhelmsland. The first European ship to enter the Sepik estuary was the Samoa in May 1885. But the river, in fact, did not yet have a European name. It was thus termed Kaiserin Augustafluß by the explorer and scientist Otto Finsch, after the German Empress Augusta.

The word Sipik was first reported by A. Full as one of two names for the watercourse—the other being Abschima—used by the natives living at the mouth of the river. A few years later, Leonhard Schultze applied the term Sepik to the entire watercourse, and it took, although Schultze also noted another name for the river, Azimar. William Churchill, writing in the Bulletin of the American Geographical Society, wrote "These are not names of the river, they are but names for small stretches of the river as known to the folk of this or that hamlet. We cannot reckon how many such names there may be in the course of more than 600 miles of the system." Since "there is no indigenous name for the whole stream", Churchill concluded that "This is clearly a case where a European designation may properly be applied." He advocated for Kaiserin-Augusta. But that name faded with the German loss of colonial control over the territory after World War One. The word Sepik henceforth became the official name of the river.

Of course, each language group had one or more of its own names for the river. For example, the Iatmul people call the river Avusett, a compound of "bone" (ava) and "lake" (tset).

Description
The river originates in the Victor Emanuel Range in the central highlands of Papua New Guinea. From its mountain headwaters near Telefomin, it travels north-west and leaves the mountains abruptly near Yapsei. From there it flows into Indonesian Papua, before turning back north-east, for the majority of its journey following the great Central Depression. Along its course it receives numerous tributaries from the Bewani and Torricelli Mountains to the north and the Central Range to the south, including the Yuat River formed by the Lai and the Jimmi.

For most of the Sepik's length, the river winds in serpentine fashion, like the Amazon River, to the Bismarck Sea off northern Papua New Guinea. It is navigable for most of its length. 

There is a 5-10 kilometre-wide belt of active meanders along most of its course, that has created a floodplain up to 70 kilometres wide, with extensive backwater swamps. There are around 1,500 oxbow and other lakes in the floodplain, the largest of which are the Chambri Lakes.

The Sepik basin is largely an undisturbed environment, with no major urban settlements, or mining and forestry activities, in the river catchment.  April Salome Forest Management Area is located in Sepik River basin.

Peoples and languages
From the headwaters to the mouth, the river basin flows through the territories of spoken of dozens of Sepik languages, each corresponding to one or more culture regions of related villages that exhibit similar social characteristics. The largest language and culture group along the river is the Iatmul people.

The Sepik-Ramu basin is home to the Torricelli, Sepik, Lower Sepik-Ramu, Kwomtari, Leonhard Schultze, Upper Yuat, Yuat, Left May, and Amto-Musan language families, while local language isolates are Busa, Taiap, and Yadë. Torricelli, Sepik, and Lower Sepik-Ramu are by far the three most internally diverse language families of the region.

History
Local villagers have lived along the river for many millennia and the river has formed the basis for food, transport and culture. There are at least 100 distinct villages and hamlets along the river, and most likely more.

Early exploration
European contact with the river started in 1885, shortly after Germany established colonial control over German New Guinea or Kaiser Wilhelmsland. The river was named by Otto Finsch, Kaiserin Augusta, after the German Empress Augusta. The colony was initially managed by the German New Guinea Company (Neuguinea-Kompagnie). Finsch, in the ship Samoa, entered only the estuary. For the most part, German interest in the river was mainly to explore its economic potential, to collect artifacts, and to recruit native laborers to work on coastal and island copra plantations.

In 1887, the Samoa returned with another scientific expedition as well as a dozen Malays, eight men from the island of New Britain, and, two members of the Rhenish Missionary Society. In the 1890s, missionaries from the Society of the Divine Word or SVD begin to proselytize along the river.
  
Europeans now increased their travels and presence along the river. In the early twentieth century, several major expeditions to the river include the Südsee-Expedition sponsored by the Hamburg Academic of Science, the German-Dutch Border Expedition and the Kaiserin-Augusta-Fluss-Expedition These expeditions, mainly German, collected flora and fauna, studied local tribes, and produced the first maps. The station town of Angoram was established in 1913 as a base on the lower Sepik for explorations, but with the beginning of World War I, the explorations ceased.

After the first World War the Australian government took trusteeship of the German colony, creating the Territory of New Guinea, and the Sepik region came under their jurisdiction. During this period the Australians established a station on the middle Sepik at Ambunti to conduct further explorations.

In 1923 journalist Beatrice Grimshaw attached herself to an expedition, and claimed to be the first white woman to ascent the Sepik, commenting on the widespread use of "pidgen-English" as a lingua franca. In 1935 Sir Walter McNicoll, the new administrator of the Territory of New Guinea, travelled up length of the Sepik to "have a look at the river people and the kind of country along the banks".

Modern 'explorers'

Despite the thorough exploration of the Sepik and the river basin by Europeans starting with the 1880s, and the extraordinarily keen knowledge of the region by local people and communities, many travelers today still see their tourism in the area as heroic efforts.

Part of this fantasy is that the river tribes are often said to have "little contact with the modern world," as the Los Angeles Times put it as late as 2017. But that is just not true, and certainly not for a sizable tourist vessel operated by Coral Expeditions. Traveling the river is said to be "one of the last great adventures on earth".

For example, in 2010 Clark Carter and Andrew Johnson traveled the length of the Sepik River from source to sea. They hiked to the source from Telefomin and kayaked down the upper reaches in an inflatable kayak. After nearly drowning in a section of rapids near Telefomin, they decided to walk through the jungle, following the river until it was calm enough to take a dugout canoe the remaining 900 kilometres to the Bismarck Sea. The expedition took six weeks. "The Sepik really appealed to me," said Carter, "because it conjures up images of remote tribes and wild animals. Probably the most alluring thing for me though, is just how un-travelled the area is."

Also in 2010, the painter Ingo Kühl, accompanied by the local artist Tomulopa Deko, traveled from Goroka via Madang, Wewak and Maprik to Pagwi and from there on the Sepik upriver to Ambunti and to the villages of Maliwai, Yambon and Yessan. He described his experiences in an illustrated book. In 2012 he repeated this expedition together with his wife and Tom Deko. They reached the settlements of Oum Number 1 and Oum Number 2 and the April River, a tributary of the Sepik.

World War II
The Japanese held the area throughout most of the Second World War. By the end of the war though, the Japanese had been completely surrounded after Hollandia and Aitape in Netherlands New Guinea were captured by Allied forces in April 1944 during Operations Reckless and Persecution. The Aitape-Wewak campaign, the battle to defeat the remaining forces by the Australian Army, was hard-fought and drawn out due to the terrain lasting until the end of the war in August 1945.

The Australians eventually pushed the Japanese back to the village of Timbunke on the middle Sepik in July 1945. After an Australian RAAF plane landed  from Timbunke the Japanese suspected that the villagers had collaborated with the Australians and proceeded to massacre 100 of the villagers.

Sepik art

The Sepik is one of the most profuse and diverse art producing regions of the world. The numerous different tribes living along the river produce magnificent wood carvings, clay pottery and other art and craft. Different areas along the Sepik produce distinct art styles so an experience curator will be visually able to distinguish individual styles. The Sepik area is well known for its sculpture masks shields and other artifacts. Many tribes use garamut drums in rituals; the drums are formed from long, hollowed-out tree trunks carved into the shape of various totem animals.

Image gallery

See also
 List of rivers of Papua New Guinea

References

External links
 
 The Sepik–Ramu System
 Sepik River
 Guide to Sepik River Carvings (Art-Pacific.com: New Guinea tribal art and Indonesian folk art)
 
 A Report on the Sepik River Basin
 Papua New Guinea Sepik River Video
 The Sepik River Expedition 2010

Rivers of Papua New Guinea
International rivers of Asia
International rivers of Oceania
Rivers of Papua (province)
Rivers of Indonesia